Rura Penthe is the name of a fictional penal colony in the following works:

 A penal colony island in the 1954 Disney film 20,000 Leagues Under the Sea
 A Klingon penal planetoid in the Star Trek universe, featured in:
The 1991 feature film Star Trek VI: The Undiscovered Country
Two 2003 episodes of Star Trek: Enterprise
"Judgment" (Star Trek: Enterprise) 
"Bounty" (Star Trek: Enterprise), 
A deleted scene from the 2009 feature film Star Trek

Fictional prisons